Ola Ghanem born November 26, 1971) is an Egyptian actress.

Filmography

Television
 Habibi Man Takoun
 Hadith Al-Sabah Wa Al-Masaa
 Wajh al-Qamar
 Zizinya
 Gisr Al-Khatar
 Al-Fostat
 Dahaya Wa Laken
 Ta'ala Nehlam Be Bokra
 Al Aar (The Shame)
 Abnmoot
 El zoga el rab3a (The fourth wife)
 Sabaa banat

Film
 Al-Agenda Al-Hamra (2000)
 Mohami Kholea (2002)
 Sahar El-Layali (2003)
 Hareem Karim (2005)
 The BabyDoll Night (2008) (cameo)
 Mohema Saaba (2007)
 El Academia (2009)
 Bedon Reqaba (2009)
 Ahasees (2010)
 Saiid Klakait (2014)

References

21st-century Egyptian actresses
1971 births
Living people
Egyptian film actresses
Egyptian television actresses
People from Alexandria